Two-time defending champion Billie Jean King successfully defended her title, defeating Judy Tegart in the final, 9–7, 7–5 to win the ladies' singles tennis title at the 1968 Wimbledon Championships. It was her second Grand Slam singles title of the year and her fifth overall.

Seeds

  Billie Jean King (champion)
  Margaret Court (quarterfinals)
  Nancy Richey (semifinals)
  Ann Jones (semifinals)
  Virginia Wade (first round)
  Maria Bueno (quarterfinals)
  Judy Tegart (final)
  Lesley Bowrey (quarterfinals)

Qualifying

Draw

Finals

Top half

Section 1

Section 2

Section 3

Section 4

Bottom half

Section 5

Section 6

Section 7

Section 8

References

External links

1968 Wimbledon Championships – Women's draws and results at the International Tennis Federation

Women's Singles
Wimbledon Championship by year – Women's singles
Wimbledon Championships
Wimbledon Championships